Carex debilis, also known as white-edge sedge, is a species of flowering plant in the sedge family, Cyperaceae. It is native in the Eastern and Central United States and Eastern Canada.

See also
 List of Carex species

References

debilis
Plants described in 1803
Flora of North America